Walter Reed Birthplace is a historic home located near Belroi, Gloucester County, Virginia.  It was built around 1825 and is a one-story, gable-roofed frame dwelling.  It has a rear shed addition.  The house was restored in 1927 and again in 1970. It was the birthplace of Dr. Walter Reed.

It was added to the National Register of Historic Places in 1973.

The house was restored by Preservation Virginia, and in 2013 was transferred to the care of the Gloucester Preservation Foundation.  It is open by appointment.

In 2015, the updated birthplace with increased land boundaries was nominated and re-added to the National Register of Historic Places.

Gallery

References

External links

  Gloucester Preservation Foundation
Dr. Walter Reed House, State Routes 614 & 616, Gloucester, Gloucester County, VA: 2 photos and 3 data pages at Historic American Buildings Survey

Historic American Buildings Survey in Virginia
Houses on the National Register of Historic Places in Virginia
Birthplace
Houses completed in 1825
Houses in Gloucester County, Virginia
Museums in Gloucester County, Virginia
Historic house museums in Virginia
National Register of Historic Places in Gloucester County, Virginia
Birthplaces of individual people